The Leica M11 is a full-frame digital rangefinder camera from Leica Camera AG. It was introduced on 13 January 2022. It uses a 60.3-megapixel image sensor, and is compatible with almost all Leica M mount lenses.

Features
The M11 uses a 60-megapixel (MP) back-illuminated sensor, a very thin, bonded two-layer filter in front of its sensor—one for IR blocking, and one for UV blocking—as well as three raw file sizes that each use the full frame (60, 37 and 18 MP). At 18 MP the camera offers up to 15 stops dynamic range. ISO range is 64 to 50000, with 64 being the base ISO. The camera has a built-in charger powered through USB-C. 

The M11 supports most M-mount lenses.

Release
The Leica M11 was introduced by Leica on 13 January 2022 in an online webcast from the factory in Wetzlar, Germany.

Along with the camera was also introduced a Visoflex 3.7 MP electronic viewfinder that attaches to the M11 as an accessory, and can be used on the previous Leica M10, Leica M10-P, Leica M10-D and Leica M10-R models with a 2.4 MP resolution.

References

External links
  (for the Leica M11)
 Review, sample photos and manual for Leica M11 by Thorsten Overgaard

M11
Digital rangefinder cameras